David Rice Kent (also known as David Ceannt; 2 February 1867 – 16 November 1930) was an Irish Sinn Féin politician.

He was born on 2 February 1867 in Coole, Castlelyons, County Cork, to David Kent and Mary Rice.

On 2 May 1916, David Kent, his mother Mrs Rice Kent and three brothers—Thomas, William and Richard—were involved in a gunfight with members of the Royal Irish Constabulary (RIC) during an arrest operation following the Easter Rising in Dublin. When the supply of ammunition being loaded by Mrs Rice Kent was at its end, Richard attempted to escape but was shot and died from his wounds within several days. Thomas was not charged with armed rebellion but with "wilful murder", executed by firing squad and buried in the Detention Barracks. David was transferred to Richmond Barracks in Dublin, where he was sentenced to death, though later was reduced to penal servitude for life. Subsequently, he was moved to Pentonville Prison in England though released from there within the year.

David Kent was elected unopposed as a Sinn Féin MP for the Cork East constituency at the 1918 general election. In January 1919, Sinn Féin MPs refused to recognise the Parliament of the United Kingdom and instead assembled at the Mansion House in Dublin as a revolutionary parliament called Dáil Éireann, though Kent did not attend. He was elected unopposed as a Sinn Féin Teachta Dála (TD) for the Cork East and North East constituency at the 1921 elections. He opposed the Anglo-Irish Treaty and voted against it.

He was re-elected for the same constituency at the 1922 general election, this time as an anti-Treaty Sinn Féin TD, and he did not sit in the Dáil from this time onwards. He was elected as a Republican TD for Cork East constituency at the 1923 general election. He was elected as one of five Sinn Féin TDs at the June 1927 general election. He did not contest the September 1927 general election.

His brother William Kent was also a TD in the 1920s and 1930s.

He died on 16 November 1930 at Bawnard, Castlelyons, County Cork.

See also
Families in the Oireachtas

References

External links
British Army intelligence file for David Kent. UK National Archives. WO 205/37. Castle File No. 759

1867 births
1930 deaths
Early Sinn Féin TDs
Members of the 1st Dáil
Members of the 2nd Dáil
Members of the 3rd Dáil
Members of the 4th Dáil
Members of the 5th Dáil
Members of the Parliament of the United Kingdom for County Cork constituencies (1801–1922)
UK MPs 1918–1922
Politicians from County Cork
People of the Irish Civil War (Anti-Treaty side)